Derbyshire County Cricket Club in 1882 was the cricket season when the English club Derbyshire had been playing for eleven years. The team played eight first class matches and won one of them

1882 season

Derbyshire played six county games, two each against Lancashire,  Sussex and Yorkshire. They also played a first-class match against MCC and a match against the touring Australians Derbyshire won one game against Sussex and lost seven. They did not play any additional matches.

The captain for the year was Robert Smith in his sixth year as captain.

The most significant new arrival was William Chatterton who was to score over 10000 runs for the club. William Cropper made his debut and was regular top bowler for the club until a football accident in 1889. Other long term players who debuted were W Hall, a print worker who played until 1892 and Henry Slater a miner who played occasional matches over several seasons. Players who only performed for the club in the 1882 season were Duncan Johnston a Royal Engineers officer who played four games, and J Hodgkinson who played one game. Two brewers from Burton also made appearances - John Eadie son of William Eadie, who played one game and Henry Sugden who played two games.

Players who played their last matches were the two long-serving  schoolmasters Abraham Shuker and Arthur Forman. Leonard Jackson retired after five years to concentrate on his hotel business and metal grinding. William Page gave up the game after the loss of the sight of an eye. Two players left the area. H Evans a railway manager moved to Glasgow, and Dudley Docker  moved to Warwickshire where he set up his business.

Thomas Foster was top scorer and William Mycroft took most wickets.

Matches

Statistics

Cricketers who played and their first-class batting performances

Maynard played several matches for Cambridge University. Docker played one game for All England and Hay played one game for MCC. Mycroft played several games for MCC and other sides.

(a) Figures adjusted for non Derbyshire matches

First-class bowling averages

(a) Figures adjusted for non Derbyshire matches

Wicket keeping
James Disney Catches 22, Stumping 2

See also
Derbyshire County Cricket Club seasons
1882 English cricket season

References

1882 in English cricket
Derbyshire County Cricket Club seasons
English cricket seasons in the 19th century